Abrantes is a Portuguese surname. Notable people with the surname include:

Alfredo Abrantes (1929–2005), Portuguese footballer
António Abrantes (born 1968), Portuguese middle-distance runner
António Abrantes Mendes (1907–1987), Portuguese footballer
Arnaldo Abrantes (born 1986), Portuguese sprinter
Arnaldo Abrantes (athlete, born 1961), Portuguese sprinter
Domingos Abrantes (born 1936), Portuguese politician
Fernando Abrantes (born 1960), German-Portuguese musician
Mara Abrantes (1934–2021), Brazilian-Portuguese singer
Rodolfo Abrantes (born 1972), Brazilian singer and musician
Roger Abrantes (born 1951), Portuguese writer

Portuguese-language surnames